Yogi's Treasure Hunt (originally titled The Funtastic Treasure Hunt) is an American animated television series and the fifth entry in the Yogi Bear franchise produced by Hanna-Barbera Productions, featuring Yogi Bear and various other Hanna-Barbera characters. It premiered in syndication in late 1985 as part of The Funtastic World of Hanna-Barbera and was Daws Butler's final Hanna-Barbera series, performing the voice of Yogi and his many other characters before his death in 1988. The show's main title song was performed by Sha Na Na's Jon Bauman.

Plot
Yogi and his friends are assigned by Top Cat to go on treasure hunts around the world. They travel aboard their ship, the S.S. Jelly Roger. Dick Dastardly and Muttley travel on their ship, the S.S. Dirty Tricks, and try to beat Yogi and friends to the treasure by engaging in their usual dirty tricks.

Regular characters
 Yogi Bear
 Boo Boo Bear
 Ranger Smith
 Huckleberry Hound
 Quick Draw McGraw
 Snagglepuss
 Top Cat
 Augie Doggie
 Doggie Daddy
 Snooper
 Blabber
 Dick Dastardly
 Muttley

Voice cast

Main voices
 Daws Butler - Yogi Bear, Huckleberry Hound, Augie Doggie, Quick Draw McGraw, Snagglepuss, Snooper and Blabber, Wally Gator, Mr. Jinks, Peter Potamus (in "Yogi's Beanstalk"), Baba Looey, Hokey Wolf, Lippy the Lion, Undercover Elephant (in "Search for the Moaning Liza," "Yogi's Heroes"), Yippee Coyote
 Don Messick - Boo Boo, Ranger Smith, Muttley, Narrator, Touché Turtle (in "Search for the Moaning Liza"), Ruff, Ricochet Rabbit (in "Snow White & the 7 Treasure Hunters"), The President of Amnesia
 Arnold Stang - Top Cat
 John Stephenson - Doggie Daddy, Officer Dibble (in "Yogi & the Beanstalk"), The President of Rhubarbia, Magnifico the Great, King Tutti-Frutti (in "The Curse of Tutti-Frutti")
 Paul Winchell - Dick Dastardly

Additional voices
 Charlie Adler (Seasons 2 & 3) - Greed Monster (in "The Greed Monster")
 Jon Bauman (Season 2) - Theme Song Performer
 Julie Bennett (Season 3) - Cindy Bear (in "Secret Agent Bear"), United Nations Speaker (in "The Attack of Dr. Mars")
 Susan Blu (Season 3) -
 Hamilton Camp (Season 3) - Mike Walnuts (in "20,000 Leaks Under the Sea")
 Pat Carroll (Season 2) - The Wicked Queen (in "Snow White & the 7 Treasure Hunters")
 Vance Colvig (Season 2) - Chopper (in "Snow White & the 7 Treasure Hunters")
 Walker Edmiston (Season 3)
 Dick Erdman (Season 1) - Happy Bing
 Linda Gary (Season 2) - Lady Creampuff (in "The Case of the Hopeless Diamond")
 Dick Gautier (Season 1) - Inka-Dinka Tribe leader
 Rebecca Gilchrist (Season 3) - 
 Arlene Golonka (Season 1) - 
 Bob Holt (Season 1) - 
 Stacy Keach, Sr. (Season 1) - Dinky Dalton (in "The Return of El Kabong")
 Gail Matthius (Season 1) - Square Rock (in "Riddle in the Middle of the Earth")
 Edie McClurg (Season 2) - Dr. Mars (in "The Attack of Dr. Mars")
 Allan Melvin (Season 2) - Magilla Gorilla (in "Search for the Moaning Liza")
 Rob Paulsen (Seasons 1 & 2) - Hansel (in "Yogi and the Unicorn")
 Joni Robbins (Season 1) - 
 David Ruprecht (Season 3) - 
 Michael Rye (Season 2) - 
 Julie Brown (Season 3) - Connie Kindly (in Y"ogi Bear on the Air")
 Ann Ryerson (Seasons 1 & 3) - Woman in the Mirror
 Marilyn Schreffler (Season 2) - Nathan
 Mimi Seton (Season 3) - 
 Andre Stojka (Season 1) - Professor Whobigone Sprock (in "Riddle in the Middle of the Earth")
 Russi Taylor (Season 3) - Penelope Pitstop
 Jean Vander Pyl (Seasons 2 & 3) - Ma Rugg (in "Search for the Moaning Liza," "Yogi's Beanstalk")
 Janet Waldo (Season 1) - Cindy Bear (in "To Bee or Not To Bee"), Little Red Riding Hood (in "Yogi and the Unicorn"), Gretel (in "Yogi and the Unicorn"), Candy House Witch (in "Yogi and the Unicorn")
 Lennie Weinrib (Season 2) - The Pink Pussycat
 Jimmy Weldon (Seasons 2 & 3) - Yakky Doodle (in "Snow White & the 7 Treasure Hunters," "Yogi's Beanstalk")
 Frank Welker (Seasons 2 & 3) - President (in "The Great American Treasure"), College Dean (in "Goodbye, Mr. Chump"), Jabberjaw (in "Goodbye, Mr. Chump"), Ziltch, Good Night Show Host
 Jonathan Winters (Season 1) - Ollie the Red-Nosed Viking (in "Ollie the Red-Nosed Viking")

Episodes

Series overview

Season 1 (1985)

Season 2 (1986–87)

Season 3 (1987–88)

Home media
Hanna-Barbera Home Video released six episodes of the series each on individual VHS tapes in Spring 1990, to promote the opening of The Funtastic World of Hanna-Barbera simulator movie ride at Universal Studios Florida.

Broadcast history

United States

International

In other languages
 Arabic: الدب يوغي- فريق المهمات الصعبة 
 Japanese: ハンナ・バーベラ秘宝探検団 (Hanna Bābera Hihō Tanken-Dan)
 Italian: La caccia al tesoro di Yoghi
 Brazilian Portuguese: Zé Colmeia e os Caça-Tesouros
 European Portuguese: A Caça ao Tesouro do Zé Colmeia

See also
 List of works produced by Hanna-Barbera
 List of Hanna-Barbera characters
 Yogi Bear (character)
 The Yogi Bear Show
 The Funtastic World of Hanna-Barbera
 The New Yogi Bear Show
 Yogi's Gang
 Galaxy Goof-Ups
 Yo Yogi!

References

External links
 
 
 The Cartoon Scrapbook – Profile on Yogi's Treasure Hunt.

1985 American television series debuts
1988 American television series endings
1980s American animated television series
American animated television spin-offs
American children's animated adventure television series
American children's animated comedy television series
American children's animated fantasy television series
American children's animated mystery television series
American Broadcasting Company original programming
Animated television series about mammals
The Funtastic World of Hanna-Barbera
Crossover animated television series
Cultural depictions of Ronald Reagan
Television series by Hanna-Barbera
English-language television shows
Yogi Bear television series
Huckleberry Hound television series
Top Cat
Wacky Races spin-offs
Treasure hunt television series
Nautical television series